Manuel Viniegra García (born 26 April 1988) is a Mexican professional footballer who plays as a midfielder.

Club career
Viniegra started his career with Liga MX club Tigres UANL. He made his professional debut during the 2007 Clausura tournament under head coach Mario Carrillo, and has played for the Mexico national football team.

International
Viniegra got called up by José Manuel de la Torre to play for Mexico against United States on August 15, 2012, and wore the number 6.

International Caps
As of 15 August 2012

Honours
Tigres UANL
Liga MX: Apertura 2011, Apertura 2015, Apertura 2016

References

External links
 
 

1988 births
Living people
Mexico international footballers
Footballers from Nuevo León
Tigres UANL footballers
Atlante F.C. footballers
C.D. Veracruz footballers
FC Juárez footballers
Liga MX players
Association football midfielders
Mexican footballers